True Spark is a 24-hour television channel for children provided by TrueVisions. It broadcast cartoons that come from Japan, United States and Europe. It broadcasts on channel 444 (digital) and channel 28 (analogue).

History 
True Spark has been broadcast since TrueVisions was IBC. In that time, it was named IBC Cartoons. It was broadcast on IBC Channel 7. After a few years, IBC Cartoons was renamed IBC Kids. It was used to broadcast for 24 hours and presents new episodes of cartoons between 6:00pm to 8:30pm. After a few years, its broadcast duration was reduced to 5:00am to 8:00pm and presents new episodes of cartoons between 6:00pm to 8:00pm. Then, in July 1998, IBC combined its business with UTV, then renamed IBC to UBC, integrating cartoons and movies into one channel, under the banner of UBC Movies & Kids - broadcast on channel 25. The channel shows children's programmes between 6:00am to 8:00pm and shows movies and drama series from 8:00pm to 6:00am.

In March 1999, UBC separated all its movies into its own movie channel, UBC Movies, and at this time, the channel was renamed UBC Kids. It was broadcast on channel 26 between 6:00am to 8:00pm. 

On 1 July 2003, it was renamed to UBC Spark, and in 2004, UBC Spark moved to channel 28, and by June 1, 2005, the channel sees its broadcasting hours extended to 9:00pm

On 1 April 2006, UBC was renamed to UBC-True and following the move, UBC Spark began broadcasting 24-hours. On 23 January 2007, UBC-True was renamed to TrueVisions, was renamed True Spark, and presents new episodes of cartoons between 4:00pm to 8:00pm.

On 15 May 2016, True Spark was split into two channels True Spark Play and True Spark Jump.

References

External links

 
 List of Thai dubbing artists

Charoen Pokphand
True Corporation
Television stations in Thailand
Children's television channels in Thailand
Television channels and stations established in 1989 
Television channels and stations disestablished in 2016